Pristimantis skydmainos is a species of frog in the family Strabomantidae.

It is found in the Amazonian lowlands in central and southern Peru, Bolivia, and extreme western Brazil, and on the lower Amazonian slopes of Peru and Ecuador.
Its natural habitats are subtropical or tropical moist lowland forests and subtropical or tropical moist montane forests.

References

skydmainos
Amphibians of Bolivia
Amphibians of Brazil
Amphibians of Ecuador
Amphibians of Peru
Amphibians described in 1997
Taxonomy articles created by Polbot